Blue Valley USD 229 is a public unified school district headquartered in Overland Park, Kansas, United States.  Located in east central and southeast Johnson County, Kansas, covering  of Overland Park including parts of Leawood and Stilwell, all within the Kansas City Metropolitan Area.

Administration
The Blue Valley School District is  under the leadership of Superintendent Tonya Merrigan

School Board
The Blue Valley School Board is  under the leadership of President Mike Sietz and Vice President Stacy Obringer-Varhall. Other board members include: Cindy Bowling, Sue Matson, Tom Mitchell, and Pam Robinson.

Schools
The school district operates the following schools:

High schools

 Blue Valley High School
 Blue Valley North High School
 Blue Valley Northwest High School
 Blue Valley Southwest High School
 Blue Valley West High School

Middle schools

 Aubry Bend Middle School
 Blue Valley Middle School
 Harmony Middle School
 Lakewood Middle School
 Leawood Middle School
 Overland Trail Middle School
 Oxford Middle School
 Pleasant Ridge Middle School
 Prairie Star Middle School

Elementary schools

 Blue River Elementary School
 Cedar Hills Elementary School
 Cottonwood Point Elementary School
 Harmony Elementary School
 Heartland Elementary School
 Indian Valley Elementary School
 Lakewood Elementary School
 Leawood Elementary School
 Liberty View Elementary School
 Mission Trail Elementary School
 Morse Elementary School
 Oak Hill Elementary School
 Overland Trail Elementary School
 Prairie Star Elementary School
 Stanley Elementary School
 Stilwell Elementary School
 Sunrise Point Elementary School
 Sunset Ridge Elementary School
 Timber Creek Elementary School
 Valley Park Elementary School
 Wolf Springs Elementary School

Administrative Buildings 
 Blue Valley Academy
 Blue Valley Center For Advanced Professional Studies
 Blue Valley District Office (Main Office Building, formerly Stanley High School)
 Blue Valley Hilltop Learning Center
 Carolyn Ball Blair Wilderness Science Center

See also
 Kansas State Department of Education
 Kansas State High School Activities Association
 List of high schools in Kansas
 List of unified school districts in Kansas

References

External links 
 

Education in Johnson County, Kansas
School districts in Kansas
Education in Overland Park, Kansas
1965 establishments in Kansas
School districts established in 1965